Isocentris is a genus of moths of the family Crambidae described by Edward Meyrick in 1887.

Species
Isocentris charopalis Swinhoe, 1907
Isocentris filalis (Guenée, 1854)
Isocentris minimalis Swinhoe, 1906
Isocentris rubralis Swinhoe, 1906
Isocentris seychellalis T. B. Fletcher, 1910

Former species
Isocentris retinalis (Saalmüller, 1880)
Isocentris thomealis Viette, 1957

References

Pyraustinae
Crambidae genera
Taxa named by Edward Meyrick